The Battle and massacre at Shar al-Shatt ( Shār’ ash-Shaṭ; Sciara Sciat in Italian) occurred on 23 October 1911 in the village of Shar al-Shatt on the outskirts of Tripoli, Libya during the Italo-Turkish War. 378 Italian officers and men were killed in the fighting and the massacre of soldiers who had surrendered. The incident became known as the "Massacre of Italians at Sciara Sciat."

Battle and massacre 
The Italian fleet appeared off Ottoman Tripoli on the evening of 28 September 1911; the city was quickly conquered by a force of 1,500 men.

Despite the quick Italian conquest of the city of Tripoli and its surroundings from the Ottoman Empire by the first days of October, the interior of Ottoman Libya shortly thereafter broke out into revolt, with Italian authorities losing control over large areas of the region.

Before the arrival of the Italian forces, cells led by Ottoman officers (called "Young Turks", like Mustafa Kemal Atatürk) encouraged native Libyans to infiltrate Italian-owned industries and companies in Tripolitania, reconnoiter roads, and take a census of all males able to bear arms in Tripoli and Derna, in preparation for a jihad of the local Muslims.

The interior of Tripolitania rose in revolt from the first weeks and the Italian soldiers were quickly defeated by the local Muslims (supported by Turkish officers), as happened in Shar al-Shatt.

The IV Battalion of the 11th Bersaglieri Regiment of Colonel Gustavo Fara had been positioned at the small oasis village as part of the defenses of Tripoli. On 23 October, the force of about 500 Italian soldiers came under attack from the Turks and Arabs and was quickly overrun and decimated. Approximately 290 'bersaglieri' who survived the initial assault surrendered to the jihadists in the local cemetery, but all were tortured and killed.

Argentine journalist Enzo D'Armesano of the Buenos Aires newspaper "La Prensa" was present the next morning in Shar al-Shatt and reported the cruelty with a description that impressed the Argentinian people. He reported that many local civilians approached the Italians' lines from behind, initially showing friendship, only to fall upon them with knives. He wrote that the three survivors of the 4th Battalion accused the Arab civilians of the Shar al-Shatt oasis of "tradimento" (betrayal).

Aftermath 

Officially, 21 Italian officers and 482 soldiers died at Shar al-Shatt, 290 of them massacred after surrender in the cemetery.

In 1932, Mussolini inaugurated a monument to the Bersaglieri in Rome, especially honoring those who died at Shar al-Shatt. The  monument was designed by architect Italo Mancini and was created by sculptor Publio Morbiducci.

See also 
Italian Libya
List of massacres in Libya

Citations

References 

 
 
 
 
 
 

Massacres in Libya
Mass murder in 1911